Alan Judd (born 1946) is a pseudonym used by Alan Edwin Petty. Born in 1946, he is a former soldier and diplomat who now works as a security analyst and writer in the United Kingdom.  He writes both books and articles, regularly contributing to a number of publications, including  The Daily Telegraph, the Spectator and The Oldie.  His books include both fiction and non-fiction titles, with his novels often drawing on his military background.

Fiction Titles 
Charles Thoroughgood novels:
A Breed of Heroes (1981 - adapted by Charles Wood as a BBC television film in 1996)
Legacy (2001)
Uncommon Enemy (2012)
Inside Enemy (2014)
Deep Blue (2017)
Accidental Agent (2019)
Queen and Country (2022)

Other novels:
Short of Glory (1984)
The Noonday Devil (1987)
Tango (1989)
The Devil's Own Work (1991)
The Kaiser's Last Kiss (2003)
Dancing with Eva (2006)
Slipstream (2015)
Shakespeare's Sword (2018)
A Fine Madness (2021)

Non fiction Titles 
Ford Madox Ford (1990)
First World War Poets (Character Sketches) (1997)
The Quest for C: Mansfield Cumming And the Founding of the Secret Service (1999)

Awards 
A Breed of Heroes won the 1981 Winifred Holtby Memorial Prize and was shortlisted and became runner-up in the 1981 Booker Prize.
In 1991, he won the Guardian Fiction Award for his book The Devil's Own Work.

References

External links

A Brief Biography
David Higham Associates

1946 births
20th-century English novelists
21st-century English novelists
English biographers
Living people
Fellows of the Royal Society of Literature
English male novelists
20th-century English male writers
21st-century English male writers
English male non-fiction writers
Male biographers